Refractory Obdurate is the seventh studio album by the American rock band Wovenhand. The album was released on April 29, 2014 through a partnership between Glitterhouse Records and Deathwish Inc.

The album was met with generally favorable reviews, and ranked at number 47 on Billboard Top Heatseekers chart.

Track listing
All songs written by David Eugene Edwards, except where noted.
 "Corsicana Clip" – 4:47	
 "Masonic Youth" – 3:39	
 "The Refractory" – 4:53	
 "Good Shepherd" – 4:00	
 "Salome" – 5:19	
 "King David" – 4:47	
 "Field of Hedon" – 3:33	
 "Obdurate Obscura" (Edwards, Chuck French) – 5:20	
 "Hiss" – 3:53	
 "El-Bow" (Edwards, French, Ordy Garrison, Neil Keener) – 2:42

Personnel

Wovenhand
 David Eugene Edwards
 Chuck French
 Ordy Garrison
 Neil Keener

Production
 Collin Jordan – mastering
 Sanford Parker – engineer, mixing

Artwork
 Jacob Bannon – design
 Neil Keener – artwork

References

External links
 Refractory Obdurate at Bandcamp

2014 albums
Wovenhand albums
Deathwish Inc. albums